Paira is an island in the Nicobar district of Andaman and Nicobar Islands, India.

Administration
The island belongs to the township of Nancowry of Teressa Taluk.

Geography
The island is a part of the Nicobar Islands chain, located in the northeast Indian Ocean between the Bay of Bengal and the Andaman Sea. 
It is located  NNW of Cape Maud of Tillanchong Island.

Image gallery

References 

Islands of the Andaman and Nicobar Islands
Nicobar district